Sahithya Pravarthaka Co-operative Society (SPCS) or Sahithya Pravarthaka Sahakarana Sangham is a cooperative society of writers in the south Indian state of Kerala for publication and sales of books. It was founded in 1945 by a group of twelve writers in Kottayam. It merged with the National Book Stall (NBS) in 1949 and has published over 8,400 titles making it one of the largest book publishers in Kerala. The society claims that over eighty percent of the known writers in Malayalam are members of the society.

References

Indic literature societies
Book publishing companies of India
Bookstores of India
Publishing companies established in 1945
Companies based in Kottayam
Cooperatives in Kerala
Arts organisations based in India
Arts organizations established in 1945
Malayalam-language literature
Indian companies established in 1945